William Henry Strutt (6 March 1878 – 5 March 1948) was an Australian politician.

He was born in Melbourne. In 1938 he was elected to the Tasmanian Legislative Council as an independent member for Hobart. In 1946 the seat, which had had three members, was divided and Strutt was assigned the seat of Queenborough. Appointed Chair of Committees in 1946, he died in Hobart in 1948.

References

1878 births
1948 deaths
Independent members of the Parliament of Tasmania
Members of the Tasmanian Legislative Council
Politicians from Melbourne